Little Heath School is a secondary special school  located in the Little Heath, Ilford in the east of the London Borough of Redbridge, England. There are currently 142 pupils aged between 11 and 19 on roll.  They all have a variety of special educational needs including general learning difficulties, language and communication difficulties, autism spectrum disorders and other more complex needs.  The headteacher is James Brownlie.

External links
 Little Heath School website
 OFSTED reports

Schools for people on the autistic spectrum
Special secondary schools in England
Special schools in the London Borough of Redbridge
Foundation schools in the London Borough of Redbridge
Ilford